Routofy.com is an online travel portal headquartered in New Delhi, India, operated by the parent company Routofy Services Pvt. Ltd. The service compares and combines various travel methods (flights, trains, buses and taxi services) to provide end-to-end connectivity to its users down to the local and less-travelled areas, in one search.

It was founded in 2014, by IIT Delhi graduates, Ronak Gupta (Co-founder & Chief Executive Officer) & Abhishek Aggarwal (Co-founder, Chief Technical Officer & an ex-Microsoft employee).

By July 2014, the beta version of the site went live in major parts of India; in February 2015, the company announced funding of an undisclosed amount from Kunal Bahl (Co-founder & CEO, Snapdeal), Rohit Bansal (Co-founder & COO, Snapdeal) and Nikunj Jain.

References

External links

Indian travel websites